Fall River Rovers were a United States soccer club, based in Fall River, Massachusetts. They won the 1888 and 1889 American Cups as well as the 1917 National Challenge Cup. In 1921 Rovers were disbanded and a new team, Fall River United were formed to enter the newly established American Soccer League.

The name was revived during the 1933–34 season by a team that played in the New England Division of the American Soccer League. Other teams in the division included another Fall River United.

History

Early years
In the late 19th century Fall River, Massachusetts, together with Kearny, New Jersey and St. Louis, Missouri, emerged as a stronghold for soccer in the United States. In the late 1870s Fall River experienced a period of economic growth, driven by the demand for cotton print cloth. Southeastern New England was the birthplace of the United States textile industry and Fall River became known as Spindle City. By 1876 the city was home to 43 factories, more than 30,000 looms and more than one million spindles. Keeping them all working required immigrant labor and, while some of the new arrivals were French Canadian and Irish, many also came from Lancashire and Glasgow, two of the earliest strongholds of soccer in the United Kingdom.  As a result, several soccer clubs, including Rovers, emerged within the city. In February 1884, the team was founded at a meeting held on County Street, Fall River.  The team joined the Bristol County Football Association in 1885.  Other clubs from the city included Fall River Olympics, Fall River Pan Americans and Fall River East Ends. Rovers, along with these clubs became affiliated with the American Football Association and entered the American Cup. Between 1888 and 1892 teams from Fall River won the cup five times in succession. Fall River Rovers won it in both 1888 and 1889. In 1891, Rovers, along with the Fall River Olympics, East Enders and Pawtucket Free Wanderers, formed the New England League. In 1903, Rovers won the Interstate League championship.  In 1907, they reentered the AFA.  The Rovers were the New England League champions in 1909 before joining the first Eastern Soccer League in 1910. When this league was abandoned during its only season, Rovers were in the lead. Between 1915 and 1921 they played in the Southern New England Soccer League, twice finishing as runners-up in 1917 and 1921. In 1917 they also won the Times Cup, the league cup of the SNESL, defeating J&P Coats 3–0 in the final.

Rivalry with Bethlehem Steel

During the late 1910s a strong inter-regional rivalry developed between  Rovers and Bethlehem Steel. The teams played against each other in three consecutive National Challenge Cup finals. Rovers were defeated in both the 1916 and the 1918 finals but won the competition in 1917. The rivalry was intensified by the fact that, at the time, Rovers featured mainly United States-born players while  Steel relied heavily on players imported from both the Scottish Football League and the English Football League. In addition neither club was immune from fan violence. The 1916 final, hosted by J&P Coats in Pawtucket, Rhode Island, attracted a crowd of 10,000, almost all backing Rovers. With the score 0–0 after 80 minutes, Steel were awarded a penalty, triggering protests from both Rovers players and fans alike. Steel subsequently converted the penalty, which was enough to win the trophy. However, with seconds remaining Rovers were denied a penalty, sparking both a riot and a pitch invasion. The 1917 final saw Steel and Rovers return to Pawtucket to play in front of a crowd of 5,000. Rovers avenged their 1916 defeat with a goal scored in the first minute giving them a hard fought 1–0 win. The 1918 final saw the two teams return to Pawtucket for a third time, this time playing out a 2–2 extra-time draw in front of 10,000. However Rovers lost the replay 3–0 in Harrison, New Jersey. The star of the Rovers team during this era was Thomas Swords, who in 1916 captained the United States in their first official international. Other notable players included John Sullivan, who scored in both the 1917 and 1918 finals, and Chick Albin.

Year-by-year

Honors

American Cup: 
Winners (2): 1888, 1889 
National Challenge Cup
Winners (1). 1917
Runners Up (2):  1916, 1918 
Times Cup
Winners (1): 1917 
New England League
Winners (1):  1909 
Southern New England Soccer League
Runners Up (2):  1916–17, 1920–21

References

Defunct soccer clubs in Massachusetts
Rovers
Southern New England Soccer League teams
American Soccer League (1933–1983) teams
1884 establishments in Massachusetts
1921 disestablishments in Massachusetts
Association football clubs established in 1884
Association football clubs disestablished in 1921
U.S. Open Cup winners